Luis Resto (born June 11, 1955) is a former Puerto Rican boxer from The Bronx, New York, who was convicted of assault and conspiracy for his part in a cheating scandal.

A journeyman boxer all his career, Resto was convicted in 1986 and jailed for 2 and a half years, for assault, criminal possession of a weapon and conspiracy. Resto had illegally altered his gloves and replaced the padding with plaster, for a boxing match against Billy Collins Jr. This gave Resto such an unfair advantage that not only did Resto achieve an undeserved win over the better boxer Collins, but injured Collins to such a degree that he never boxed again and later died in an automobile crash.

Personal life
Luis Resto was born in Juncos, Puerto Rico, and moved to the Bronx when he was nine years old. Late in his eighth grade year, he elbowed his math teacher in the face, and spent six months in a rehabilitation center for the mentally disturbed. Not long after getting out, an uncle signed him up for boxing lessons in a Bronx gym.

A two-time New York Golden Gloves amateur state champion in the welterweight division, Resto trained at the Police Athletic Leagues Lynch Center. He won both the 1975 and 1976 147 lb Golden Gloves Open Championships. Resto defeated Miguel Hernandez in the finals of the 1976 147 lb Open Championship.

Professional career

Early career
Resto made his professional boxing debut on February 4, 1977 with a points defeat of Julio Chevalier.  He scored his first professional knockout in his third professional fight, against Mike Lytell in May of the same year. Resto remained unbeaten with a 7-0 record until his eighth bout, a knockout loss to Bruce Curry in March 1978.

Through 29 fights Resto had compiled a record of 20-8-1, but with only eight wins by knockout, which made him appear to be a light-punching, high-level journeyman. Although he was ranked 10th in the world, he was practically unknown outside the New York area.

Bout with Billy Collins Jr.
On June 16, 1983 Resto unexpectedly beat undefeated prospect Billy Collins Jr. at Madison Square Garden in New York City in a 10-round unanimous decision. The fight was the undercard for a bout between Roberto Durán and Davey Moore.

However, when Collins' father and trainer, Billy Sr., came to shake Resto's hand, he discovered that Resto's gloves felt thinner than normal. Screaming that he thought the gloves had no padding, Collins Sr. demanded that the New York State Athletic Commission impound the gloves. An investigation revealed that someone had removed an ounce of padding from each of his gloves then filled them with chalk. Collins' eyes were swollen shut by the end of the 10th round, and the rest of his face was so badly swollen that it was impossible to believe a light puncher could have inflicted such damage.

Collins suffered a torn iris and permanently blurred vision, ending his career. He died only months later when he drove his car into a culvert while intoxicated. Some commentators have speculated that the loss of his livelihood drove him into a downward spiral. Collins' father has since speculated that his son committed suicide.

After a month's investigation, the New York State Boxing Commission determined that Resto's trainer, Panama Lewis, had removed the padding from Resto's gloves. It also determined that Resto should have known the gloves were illegal. The commission suspended Resto's boxing license for at least a year. Since most state boxing commissions honor sanctions from other states, this effectively banned Resto from boxing in the United States for the duration of the ban.  The commission subsequently changed its rules to prevent anything like what happened to Collins from ever happening again. Resto's win was subsequently changed to a no contest.

In 1986, Lewis and Resto were both put on trial and found guilty of assault, criminal possession of a weapon (Resto's hands) and conspiracy. Prosecutors charged that Resto had to have known the gloves were illegal, and therefore the bout amounted to an illegal 10-round assault. Prosecutors also argued that the plot was centered on a large amount of money bet on Resto by a third party, who had met with Lewis prior to the fight.  Resto served 2 and a half years in prison.

After 15 years of trying to regain his license, he was finally allowed to work as a cornerman by New York State.  For many years, he has lived in an apartment near the gym where he once trained, and has worked with youngsters there as well.

For almost a quarter-century, Resto publicly denied knowing that Lewis had tampered with the gloves.  However, in 2007, Resto apologized to Collins's widow, Andrea Collins-Nile, who attempted to sue the state of New York for not protecting her late husband. Resto also told Collins-Nile that in addition to removing padding from the gloves, Lewis soaked his hand wraps in plaster of Paris.  This caused the wraps to harden into plaster casts similar to those used to set broken bones, which greatly—and illegally—increased Resto's punching power. The hand wraps have never been confiscated. Resto also disclosed that Lewis would break apart pills used to treat asthma and pour the medicine into his water bottles, giving Resto greater lung capacity in the later rounds of a fight. Resto also visited Collins's gravesite and said, "I'm sorry for what I did to you." At a 2008 press conference, Resto said that he knew Lewis had taken the padding out of his gloves and had done so at least twice before. Resto said he did not protest at the time even though he knew it was wrong. "At the time, I was young," he said. "I went along." Resto was 28 years old at the time of the incident.

The 1983 incident and subsequent aftermath is covered in the Showtime documentary Assault in the Ring.  During this documentary, Resto appeared to confirm law enforcement's theory that the incident was rooted in large bets on him.

Professional boxing record

References

External links 
 

1955 births
Living people
American people convicted of assault
Cheating in sports
Puerto Rican male boxers
Sports controversies
Welterweight boxers
Prisoners and detainees of New York (state)
People from Juncos, Puerto Rico
People from the Bronx
Combat sports controversies